Kaseem Tyrone Sinceno (born March 26, 1976) is a former American football tight end who played four seasons in the National Football League with the Philadelphia Eagles and Chicago Bears. He played college football at Syracuse University and attended Liberty High School in Liberty, New York. He was also a member of the Green Bay Packers and Houston Texans.

References

External links
Just Sports Stats
College stats

Living people
1976 births
American football tight ends
African-American players of American football
Syracuse Orange football players
Philadelphia Eagles players
Chicago Bears players
Players of American football from New York City
People from Liberty, New York
21st-century African-American sportspeople
20th-century African-American sportspeople